Matts Kunding was an Irish footballer in the early part of the 20th century. A left-midfielder, Kunding was one of the first Irish professional footballers to ply their trade on the continent.

Club career
Although an Irishman, Kunding played his entire, yet brief career in Italy, notably in Turin. He signed for Torino in 1909, making his debut in the Turin Derby against Juventus, winning the game 3-1 at the Velodrome Humbert I. He played in a strong Torino midfield alongside Englishman Arthur Rodgers. That season, Torino finished fourth in the Serie A.

The next season, he moved to Torino's bitter rivals Juventus, donning the famous black and white stripped shirt for the 1910-1911 season. He joined an increasingly international Juventus side, playing as the only Irishman in a team then dominated by Swiss players. He made his debut for the Old Lady in a 1-1 draw against Piedmont Football Club on 27 November 1910. After impressing in a 2-0 win over Andrea Doria, Kunding was later dropped after a dismal showing in a 0-2 home defeat to AC Milan. His last game for Juventus came in a 3-0 defeat to Genoa on 19 March 1911, with the team finishing in last place in the Serie A.

Kunding was the first Irish-born player to play in the Italian League, setting an example for fellow Irishmen Paddy Sloan and Liam Brady to follow.

References

External links
Statistiche su Myjuve.it

Republic of Ireland association footballers
Republic of Ireland expatriate association footballers
Serie A players
Expatriate footballers in Italy
Juventus F.C. players
Torino F.C. players
Place of birth missing
Year of birth missing
Year of death missing
Association football midfielders